The Guadalajara Cathedral or Cathedral of the Assumption of Our Lady, located in Centro, Guadalajara, Jalisco, is the Roman Catholic cathedral of the Archdiocese of Guadalajara and a minor basilica. It is built in the Spanish Renaissance style, except its neo-Gothic spires.

History

The first cathedral was built in 1541 on the site of the present Templo de Santa Maria de Gracia. This primitive church was built with adobe and a thatched roof. Nevertheless, in 1548 the region was declared a diocese by the Holy See and the church became the cathedral of the city.

On May 30, 1574, during Mass, neighbors fired shots into the air. Some of the bullets fell onto the cathedral and started a fire, severely damaging the building. Work began on a new cathedral designed by master architect Martín Casillas, which was commissioned in 1561 by King Felipe II, but progressed slowly because of scarce funds. The new cathedral was completed in February 1618. Finally in April of that year, the Blessed Sacrament was moved from the former church to the new one; however, it would not be consecrated until October 12, 1716. In 1818, an earthquake shook the city, causing the towers and the dome to collapse. These were replaced, but the new structures were destroyed by a subsequent earthquake in 1849. The new towers were designed by architect Manuel Gómez Ibarra. Construction took three years and cost 33,521 pesos. The new structures were completed in 1854. Pope Pius XII elevated the cathedral to the rank of a minor basilica.

Currently, the cathedral continues to be in danger: it was damaged by earthquakes in 1932, 1957, 1979, 1985, 1995 and 2003. Current threats include a slight tilt of the north tower and structural damage to the dome.

The cathedral occupies an area that is 77.8 x 72.75 meters. It contains altars dedicated to Our Lady of the Assumption, Our Lady of Guadalupe, Our Lady of Sorrows, Our Lady of Zapopan (patron saint of Guadalajara), Saint Dominic, St. Nicholas, St. Thomas Aquinas, St. Christopher and St. John of God. The altar is made of marble and silver. The stained glass was imported from France.

The cathedral houses the mummified body of Santa Innocencia (a young girl from the 1700s who, according to legend, was killed by her father for converting to Catholicism),  well as the remains of three cardinals and several other former bishops of the diocese, and Fr. Juan Jesús Posadas Ocampo, who was assassinated in 1993 at the Guadalajara International Airport.

Gallery

See also
Basilica of Our Lady of Zapopan
List of basilicas

References

External links
Ocf.berkeley.edu: All about Guadalajara

Buildings and structures in Guadalajara, Jalisco
Roman Catholic cathedrals in Mexico
Roman Catholic churches completed in 1618
Basilica churches in Mexico
Shrines to the Virgin Mary
National Monuments of Mexico
Tourist attractions in Guadalajara, Jalisco
Renaissance architecture in Mexico
Spanish Colonial architecture in Mexico
Articles containing video clips
1618 establishments in the Spanish Empire
Roman Catholic shrines in Mexico
17th-century Roman Catholic church buildings in Mexico
Centro, Guadalajara